Peyritschia is a genus of Latin American plants in the grass family.

 Species
 Peyritschia conferta (Pilg.) Finot - Venezuela, Ecuador
 Peyritschia deyeuxioides (Kunth) Finot - Mexico, Central America, Colombia, Venezuela, Ecuador
 Peyritschia howellii (Hitchc.) Finot & P.M.Peterson - Galápagos
 Peyritschia humilis (Louis-Marie) Finot - central Mexico
 Peyritschia koelerioides (Peyr.) E.Fourn. - Mexico, Guatemala
 Peyritschia pinetorum (Swallen) Finot & P.M.Peterson - Mexico, Guatemala
 Peyritschia pringlei (Scribn.) S.D.Koch - Mexico, Guatemala, Costa Rica, Venezuela

References

Pooideae
Poaceae genera